Burling is a surname with English origins, deriving from Essex and Cambridgeshire, being a habitational name from a place in Kent named Birling. It was an Old English personal name of Burla with the suffix 'ingas' denoting "family or followers".

It may refer to:

 Albert E. Burling (1891–1960), American justice of the New Jersey state supreme court
 Bobby Burling (born 1984), American soccer player
 Carroll Burling (born 1934), American politician from Nebraska
 Daniel Burling (born  1947), American politician from New York
 Edward J. Burling (1819–1892), American architect from New York
 Edward B. Burling (1871–1966), American lawyer
 George C. Burling (1834–1885), U.S. Union Army officer during the American Civil War
 George T. Burling (1849–1928), American banker and politician from New York
 Henry Burling (1801–1911), New Zealand pioneer settler and mailman
 Paul Burling (born 1970), British impressionist
 Peter Burling (politician) (born 1945), American politician from Washington, D.C.
 Peter Burling (sailor) (born 1991), New Zealand Olympic sailor
 Robbins Burling (1926-2021), American professor of anthropology and linguistics

Other uses
Burling is a skill developed by lumberjacks, also called log rolling

See also
 Beurling

References

External links
 Burling Family Papers, 1666-2001, New-York Historical Society